Alwin de Groot is a Dutch Paralympic swimmer. He represented the Netherlands at the 1992 Summer Paralympics and at the 1996 Summer Paralympics.

In total, he won six gold medals, five silver medals and two bronze medals at the Summer Paralympics.

References

External links 
 

Living people
Year of birth missing (living people)
Place of birth missing (living people)
Dutch male backstroke swimmers
Dutch male breaststroke swimmers
Dutch male freestyle swimmers
Dutch male butterfly swimmers
Dutch male medley swimmers
Paralympic swimmers of the Netherlands
Paralympic gold medalists for the Netherlands
Paralympic silver medalists for the Netherlands
Paralympic bronze medalists for the Netherlands
Swimmers at the 1992 Summer Paralympics
Swimmers at the 1996 Summer Paralympics
Medalists at the 1992 Summer Paralympics
Medalists at the 1996 Summer Paralympics
Paralympic medalists in swimming
S10-classified Paralympic swimmers
20th-century Dutch people